Namugenyi "Nam" Kiwanuka is a Ugandan-Canadian television personality and journalist. 

Kiwanuka came to Canada with her family in 1983, following the Ugandan Civil War. She was given the Christian name Mary. She was a VJ for MuchMusic from 1999 to 2003 and later hosted basketball and football programming on Rogers Sportsnet that included the weekly NBA XL program. She is currently a reporter and substitute anchor on TVOntario's newsmagazine series The Agenda. Kiwanuka has volunteered overseas for War Child Canada, Journalists for Human Rights and the Canadian Red Cross.

References

External links
 

Living people
Black Canadian broadcasters
Canadian television sportscasters
Much (TV channel) personalities
Toronto Metropolitan University alumni
Ugandan emigrants to Canada
Women sports announcers
Black Canadian women
Canadian television reporters and correspondents
Canadian women television journalists
Year of birth missing (living people)
Canadian VJs (media personalities)